Grohman Narrows Provincial Park is a provincial park in British Columbia, Canada.

It is named after  William Adolf Baillie Grohman.

External links
Grohman Narrows Provincial Park

Provincial parks of British Columbia
Regional District of Central Kootenay
Year of establishment missing